National nature reserves in Lancashire in England are established by Natural England.

There are two national nature reserves in Lancashire, both of which are managed by Natural England, as opposed to some counties where some nature reserves are managed by non-governmental organisations such as the Royal Society for the Protection of Birds or the National Trust.

List of reserves

Gait Barrows NNR: limestone habitat
Ribble Estuary NNR: wintering wildfowl

National nature reserves in other areas of England
National nature reserves in England
Natural England

References

 Lancashire
Nature reserves in Lancashire